Nagercoil was a Lok Sabha constituency in Tamil Nadu, India. K. Kamaraj. The first elected Chief Minister of Tamil Nadu was elected twice to the Lok Sabha from here. It has been now named as Kanyakumari (Lok Sabha constituency).

Kamarajar by-election victory
The death of A. Nesamony in 1968 led to the by-election in Nagercoil constituency. Realising the popularity of Kamaraj in this constituency and the potential danger posed by Kamaraj's election after the Indian National Congress party's debacle in 1967 election, C. Rajagopalachari wrote in Swarajya, the magazine of the Swatantra Party, about the need to defeat him and appealed to C. N. Annadurai to support M. Mathias, the Swatantra Party candidate. Annadurai deputed M. Karunanidhi, the then Minister for Public Works, to Nagercoil to work in support of Mathias. Despite the efforts, Kamaraj won decisively with a 1,28,201-vote margin on 8 January 1969.

Assembly segments
Nagercoil Lok Sabha constituency used to be composed of the following assembly segments:
Colachel
Killyur
Nagercoil
Padmanabhapuram
Thiruvattar
Vilavancode.

Kanyakumari district which includes Nagercoil Lok Sabha constituency was a constituent of Travancore-Cochin state before merging with Tamil Nadu in 1956.

Members of the Parliament

 In 2008, the Nagercoil constituency was renamed Kanyakumari. For results post-2008, please see Kanyakumari (Lok Sabha constituency)

Election Results

General Election 2004

References

Bibliography
Volume I, 1951 Indian general election, 1st Lok Sabha
Volume I, 1957 Indian general election, 2nd Lok Sabha
Volume I, 1962 Indian general election, 3rd Lok Sabha
Volume I, 1967 Indian general election, 4th Lok Sabha
Volume I, 1971 Indian general election, 5th Lok Sabha
Volume I, 1977 Indian general election, 6th Lok Sabha
Volume I, 1980 Indian general election, 7th Lok Sabha
Volume I, 1984 Indian general election, 8th Lok Sabha
Volume I, 1989 Indian general election, 9th Lok Sabha
Volume I, 1991 Indian general election, 10th Lok Sabha
Volume I, 1996 Indian general  election, 11th Lok Sabha
Volume I, 1998 Indian general election, 12th Lok Sabha
Volume I, 1999 Indian general election, 13th Lok Sabha
Volume I, 2004 Indian general election, 14th Lok Sabha

See also
 Nagercoil
 List of constituencies of the Lok Sabha

Former Lok Sabha constituencies of Tamil Nadu
Former constituencies of the Lok Sabha
2008 disestablishments in India
Constituencies disestablished in 2008